Jennifer Mary Paterson (3 April 1928 – 10 August 1999) was a British celebrity cook, author, actress and television personality who appeared on the television programme Two Fat Ladies (1996–1999) with Clarissa Dickson Wright. Prior to this, she wrote a cookery column both for The Spectator and for The Oldie.

The pair were famous for their rich traditional meals made from scratch. Paterson was known for her liberal use of butter and cream, remarking on her television show in her usual manner with a shake of the hand, that yoghurt was only fit for vegetarians and those with "a poor tummy". They travelled to filming locations throughout the UK on Paterson's Triumph Thunderbird motorbike with Dickson Wright occupying the sidecar.

Life and career
Paterson came from an Army family, of which she later wrote, "My mother had no idea of how to cook and no wish to learn, existing on gorgonzola, coffee, and chocolates after the demise of any form of servant. My father, having gone through two World Wars, was far too frightened to put on a kettle and my brothers, who married young to very good wives... never showed any signs of wanting to whip up something delicious for a treat."

Paterson was expelled from convent school at 15 for being disruptive. Paterson later became a matron at a girls' boarding school near Reading before ending up as a cook for the Ugandan Legation in London and becoming a well-known figure on the London party circuit. She worked on the ITV show Candid Camera and later became a food writer for The Spectator; for 15 years, she provided weekly lunches for personalities, including King Charles when he was a prince. She later wrote a book of recipes and reminiscences from her time at The Spectator entitled Feast Days, Recipes from The Spectator, in the introduction to which the English writer A. N. Wilson professed, "Jennifer Paterson is the best cook I know."

Paterson was a committed Roman Catholic who never married or had any children. She was diagnosed with lung cancer in July 1999 and died a month later in London. She asked for caviar for her last meal but died before she could eat it. Following a traditional requiem mass, she was cremated at Putney Vale Crematorium and her ashes were interred in the cemetery there.

Paterson was a parishioner of the London Oratory, and in her will, she left them a bequest that is used to fund their choir programme.

Bibliography
 Feast Days: Recipes from the Spectator (1991)
 Two Fat Ladies: Gastronomic Adventures with Clarissa Dickson Wright (1996)
 Jennifer's Diary: By One Fat Lady (1997 )
 Two Fat Ladies Ride Again with Clarissa Dickson Wright (1997)
 Seasonal Receipts (1998)
 Two Fat Ladies Full Throttle with Clarissa Dickson Wright  (1998)
 Two Fat Ladies – Obsessions with Clarissa Dickson Wright (1999)
 Enjoy!: A Celebration of Jennifer PatersonTribute to a Fat Lady by Her Friends 2000.
 The Very Best of Two Fat Ladies : Over 150 Favourite Recipes from Their Best Selling Books with Clarissa Dickson Wright (Ebury Publishing, 2000)

Forewords written
Indian Cooking by Savitri Chowdhary (Cookery Classics – September 1, 1999)

Television
 Food and Drink (1993-1995)
 Two Fat Ladies (1996-1999, 24 episodes) (With Clarissa Dickson Wright)
 Have I Got News For You (29 November 1996)
 The End of the Year Show (31 December 1996) (With Clarissa Dickson Wright)
 All Over The Shop (8 January 1997) (With Clarissa Dickson Wright)
 Songs of Praise: Food Praise (9 February 1997: Bournville) (With Clarissa Dickson Wright)
 The Rosie O'Donnell Show (23 September 1997) (With Clarissa Dickson Wright)
 The Tonight Show with Jay Leno (24 September 1997) (With Clarissa Dickson Wright)
 Jennifer Paterson's Diary (1997, 12 episodes)
 Clive Anderson All Talk (September 1997) (With Clarissa Dickson Wright)
 The End of the Year Show (31 December 1997) (With Clarissa Dickson Wright)
 Live! with Regis and Kathie Lee (18 February 1998) (With Clarissa Dickson Wright)
 Good Morning America (20 February 1998) (With Clarissa Dickson Wright)
 In the Kitchen With Bob (21 February 1998) (With Clarissa Dickson Wright) (QVC on The Shopping Network)
 Organic Food Awards (28 October 1998) (With Clarissa Dickson Wright)
 Wish You Were Here...? (1998)
 Entertainment Tonight (December 1998) (With Clarissa Dickson Wright)
 Carlton London Restaurant Awards (15 March 1999)
 Royal Television Society Awards (29.03.1999) (With Clarissa Dickson Wright)

Motion picture
 Fish and Milligan (1966) Lady Director
  Caravaggio (1986) As an Extra
 What Rats Won't Do (1998) as Justice Bradley

DVD release
The Two Fat Ladies DVD set contains a 40-minute BBC tribute to Paterson that aired in 1999 (Ending Credits). The DVD box set was released in the United States in July 2008. The Acorn Media release contains all 24 episodes across four discs. The show had been released in Britain as a Region 2 DVD set.

References

External links

 
Jennifer Paterson at BBC Food

1928 births
1999 deaths
20th-century English actresses
Burials at Putney Vale Cemetery
Deaths from lung cancer in England
English chefs
English television actresses
English television chefs
English Roman Catholics